John Glair (born March 8, 1942) is an American sprint canoer who competed in the late 1960s. He was eliminated in the semifinals of the K-1 1000 m event at the 1968 Summer Olympics in Mexico City.

References
Sports-reference.com profile

1942 births
American male canoeists
Canoeists at the 1968 Summer Olympics
Living people
Olympic canoeists of the United States
Place of birth missing (living people)
20th-century American people